Golestaneh (also Romanized as Golestāneh) is a village in Qohrud Rural District, Qamsar District, Kashan County, Isfahan Province, Iran. At the 2006 census, its population was 17, in 5 families.

References 

Populated places in Kashan County